South Raub is a small unincorporated community on the border of Randolph and Wea Townships in Tippecanoe County, Indiana.

History
A post office was established at South Raub in 1878, and remained in operation until it was discontinued in 1926.

Geography
South Raub is located at 40°18′05″ N, 86°54′49″ W (40.301389, -86.913611) along County Road 800 South half a mile west of US Route 231/State Road 43.  A CSX rail line connecting the cities of Lafayette and Crawfordsville passes through the town.  It has an elevation of approximately 711 feet.

Wea Creek flows within half a mile of South Raub to the north and west.

Lapham Feed and Grain
Lapham Feed and Grain, Inc. was started in 1956 by Richard and Eula Lapham who moved to South Raub from Decatur, Illinois; it was sometimes called the South Raub Elevator by many of the farmers. On November 24, 1959, there was a 20-car coal train wreck which demolished the west side of the elevator. There were no injuries and the elevator was rebuilt.

References

Unincorporated communities in Tippecanoe County, Indiana
Unincorporated communities in Indiana